The United People's Party was a political party in Singapore, formed by the former People's Action Party (PAP) leader Ong Eng Guan in 1961. After it won a seat in the Legislative Assembly (won by Ong Eng Guan), in the 1963 General Elections, the party's existence was in doubt as Singapore was knocked out of the Malaysian federation by Malaysia. In June 1965, Ong resigned from his seat and the seat was subsequently won back by the PAP in the by-election. By the 1968 election, the party had dissolved.

References

Background of UPP

Defunct political parties in Singapore
1961 establishments in Singapore
1968 disestablishments in Singapore
Political parties established in 1961
Political parties disestablished in 1968